231 (two hundred [and] thirty-one) is the natural number following 230 and preceding 232.

Two hundred [and] thirty-one 231 = 3·7·11, sphenic number, triangular number, doubly triangular number, hexagonal number, octahedral number, centered octahedral number, the number of integer partitions of 16, Mertens function returns 0, and is the number of cubic inches in a U.S. liquid gallon.

References 

Integers